Babelomurex macrocephalus is a species of sea snail, a marine gastropod mollusc in the family Muricidae, the murex snails or rock snails.

Description

Distribution
The holotype of this marine species was found off New Caledonia.

References

 Oliverio, M. (2008). Coralliophilinae (Neogastropoda: Muricidae) from the southwest Pacific. in: Héros, V. et al. (Ed.) Tropical Deep-Sea Benthos 25. Mémoires du Muséum national d'Histoire naturelle (1993). 196: 481-585

macrocephalus
Gastropods described in 2008